The Grizzly and the Grizzly 2.0 is a 3D printed .22-caliber rifle created around August 2013. It was created using a Stratasys Dimension 1200es printer. It was created by a Canadian only known by the pseudonym "Matthew" and told The Verge that he is in his late 20s, and his main job is making tools for the construction industry.

The original Grizzly fired 1 shot then broke Grizzly 2.0 fired 14 bullets before getting damaged due to the strain.

Specification
The “Grizzly 2.0″ has 50 percent larger barrel with a rifled bore, a larger receiver and new hammer. In a video posted online by the creator, the Grizzly seemed to have successfully fired a Winchester Dynapoint .22-caliber bullet, like the Liberator .380. The only metal in the Grizzly is a 1-inch roofing nail plus whatever metal is in the cartridge.

Printer
The printer used to make the rifle was a Stratasys Dimension 1200es printer costing $10,000 as of August 2013. It was made using ABS plastic.

"Matthew" said the rifle had taken 3 days to build, and about 27 hours to print it. He revealed it took him 13 hours to print the receiver, 6.5 hours to print the barrel, 5 hours to print the stock and 2 hours to print the rifle's internal parts.

See also
List of notable 3D printed weapons and parts

References

.22 LR rifles
3D printed firearms

External links
Grizzly_Handgun-Canadiangunnut